Holon Institute of Technology (HIT), is a public college in Holon, Israel. The institution focuses on science, technology, design & visual arts.  HIT offers diverse programs that enhance the interdisciplinary approach. The programs range from industrial design to visual communication design, to various specializations in engineering, science and technology. HIT conducts both theoretical and applied research; it has been active in the local and international art, technology & design scenes, and has maintained strong ties with the industry in Israel and abroad.

History
The Holon Institute of Technology was founded in 1969 by Abraham Margalith with the support of the Mayor of Holon, Pinchas Eylon. In the belief that technical vocational training was not sufficient to prepare engineers to work in Israel's developing industry, Margalith envisaged HIT as an academic center for technological education combining academic study and practical experience in industry.

It opened with 100 students as the Center for Technological Education Holon (CTEH). Up until the year 2000, it was affiliated with Tel Aviv University. In 2000, it became an independent institution called the Holon Academic Institute of Technology (HAIT) and was recognized by the Council for Higher Education in Israel as an institute of higher education. In 2006, it became the Holon Institute of Technology (HIT). In 2015 Professor Eduard Yakubov assumed the presidency at HIT as the 4th and current President.

The HIT single campus in the center of Holon stretches over about 50,000 square meters and includes eight buildings, two of which were constructed in the last few years. The combined area of the eight buildings is over 23,000 square meters.

Academic programs
About 4,300 students study in HIT, in the following program:
 Electrical engineering: B.Sc. and M.Sc.
 Management of technology: B.Sc. and M.Sc. 
 Applied mathematics: B.Sc.
 Computer sciences: B.Sc. and M.Sc.
 Design:
 Industrial design: B.Design

 Interior design: B.Design
 Visual communications design: B.Design
 Integrated design: M.Design 
 Instructional technologies: B.A. and M.A.

Research, Development and External Affairs Authority 

The Research, Development and External Relations Authority ("RDE Authority") was established in 2000 to transform HIT into a leading research institution. HIT is ranked among the 10th best Israeli academic institutions. The RDE Authority raises funds for various research projects carried out in collaboration with other universities, research institutions and industries in Israel and abroad.

See also
Education in Israel
List of universities and colleges in Israel

References

External links
 

Colleges in Israel
Educational institutions established in 1969
Holon
Buildings and structures in Tel Aviv District
1969 establishments in Israel